The Traitors is an American reality television series, that is based on the Dutch series De Verraders. It is hosted by Scottish actor Alan Cumming. The first season was released on Peacock on January 12, 2023. In February 2023, the series was renewed for a second season.

Following the premise of other versions of De Verraders, the show features a group of contestants participating in a game similar to the party game Mafia - in which a small group of contestants become the titular "Traitors", and must work together to eliminate the other contestants order to win a grand prize, while the remaining contestants become "Faithfuls" and are tasked to discover and banish the Traitors by voting them out, in order to win the grand prize.

Format

Twenty contestants arrive at a castle in the Scottish Highlands with hopes of winning a share of the $250,000 prize. The players are referred to as the "Faithful" but among them are the "Traitors" – a group of contestants selected by the host, whose goal is to eliminate the Faithfuls and claim the prize for themselves. Should the Faithful contestants eliminate all the Traitors, they will share the prize fund, but if any Traitors make it to the end, they steal the money.

Each night, the Traitors come together and decide upon one Faithful contestant to "murder" – and that person will leave the game immediately. The remaining Faithful contestants will not know who has been eliminated until the following day when that person does not enter the Castle for breakfast. The group then take part in a mission to add money to the prize fund. Some challenges will also offer an opportunity for players to visit the Armory - during which one player will randomly and secretly be awarded the Shield. The Shield gives the player immunity from being murdered, but not from the Banishment Vote at The Round Table. An attempted murder on the shield holder will result in no player being eliminated by Murder.

At the end of each day, the players participate in a Round Table, where they discuss who to vote out before individually voting for a player to be banished. Players cast their votes privately before revealing their votes in turn to everyone once all votes are locked-in, and may give a brief rationale for the vote. The person who received the most votes for banishment is eliminated from the game and must reveal their affiliation. In some instances (see Episode 7), when a Traitor is eliminated the remaining Traitors are given the opportunity to recruit another player. 

Once the game has reached the final four, the remaining players participate in the Endgame. The players are given a choice to "Banish Again" or "End Game". A unanimous End Game vote would conclude the game, while a single vote to Banish would result in another Banishment Vote, followed by another choice between “Banish” or “End Game”. If the game ends and all remaining players are Faithful, then the prize money will be divided evenly among them.  However, if any Traitors remain, they will steal the entire pot.

Contestants

20 contestants competed in the first season of The Traitors. The American cast featured ten notable former reality television participants and ten members of the general public.

{| class="wikitable sortable" style="margin:auto; text-align:center"
|+List of The Traitors contestants
! rowspan="2" scope="col" |Contestant
! rowspan="2" scope="col" |Age
! rowspan="2" scope="col" |From
! rowspan="2" scope="col" |Occupation/Original Series
! rowspan="2" |Affiliation
! rowspan="2" |Finish
|-
! scope="row" style="text-align:left;font-weight:normal" | 
| 48
| Los Angeles,California
| Shahs of Sunset
| rowspan=9 bgcolor="#0047AB" style="color:#FFFFFF;"|Faithful 
| style="background:darkred; color:white;"|Murdered(Episode 2)
|-
! scope="row" style="text-align:left;font-weight:normal" | 
| 29
| North Hollywood,California
| Actress
| style="background:salmon; color:black;"|Banished(Episode 2)
|-
! scope="row" style="text-align:left;font-weight:normal" | 
| 33
| Rye,New York
| Tech sales executive
| style="background:darkred; color:white;"|Murdered(Episode 3)
|-
! scope="row" style="text-align:left;font-weight:normal" | 
| 49
| Beverly Hills,California
| The Real Housewives of Beverly Hills
| style="background:salmon; color:black;"|Banished(Episode 3)
|-
! scope="row" style="text-align:left;font-weight:normal" | 
| 35
| Los Angeles,California
| Yoga instructor
| style="background:darkred; color:white;"|Murdered(Episode 4)
|-
! scope="row" style="text-align:left;font-weight:normal" | 
| 35
| Oneida,Kentucky
| DMV office manager
| style="background:salmon; color:black;"|Banished(Episode 4)
|-
! scope="row" style="text-align:left;font-weight:normal" | 
| 37
| Gainesville,Florida
| Olympic swimmer
| style="background:darkred; color:white;"|Murdered(Episode 5)
|-
! scope="row" style="text-align:left;font-weight:normal" | 
| 39
| New York City,New York
| Summer House
| style="background:salmon; color:black;"|Banished(Episode 5)
|-
! scope="row" style="text-align:left;font-weight:normal" | 
| 30
| Carlisle,Pennsylvania
| Emergency room nurse
| style="background:thistle;"|Walked(Episode 5)
|-
! scope="row" style="text-align:left;font-weight:normal" | 
| 32
| New York City,New York
| Big Brother 16| bgcolor="#67002f" align="center" span style="color:#FFFFFF;"|Traitor
| style="background:salmon; color:black;"|Banished(Episode 7)
|-
! scope="row" style="text-align:left;font-weight:normal" | 
| 28
| Staten Island,New York
| Hair stylist
| rowspan=4 bgcolor="#0047AB" align="center" span style="color:#FFFFFF;"|Faithful
| style="background:darkred; color:white;"|Murdered(Episode 7)
|-
! scope="row" style="text-align:left;font-weight:normal" | 
| 31
| Beaumont,Texas
| Public affairs manager
| style="background:salmon; color:black;"|Banished(Episode 7)
|-
! scope="row" style="text-align:left;font-weight:normal" | 
| 37
| Birmingham,Alabama
| Big Brother 12| style="background:salmon; color:black;"|Banished(Episode 8)
|-
! scope="row" style="text-align:left;font-weight:normal" | 
| 42
| Dunedin,Florida
| Survivor: Palau| style="background:darkred; color:white;"|Murdered(Episode 9)
|-
! scope="row" style="text-align:left;font-weight:normal" | 
| 28
| Los Angeles,California
| Veteran
| bgcolor="#67002f" align="center" span style="color:#FFFFFF;"|Traitor
| style="background:salmon; color:black;"|Banished(Episode 9)
|-
! scope="row" style="text-align:left;font-weight:normal" | 
| 39
| Fort Lauderdale,Florida
| Below Deck| bgcolor="#0047AB" align="center" span style="color:#FFFFFF;"|Faithful
| style="background:salmon; color:black;"|Banished(Episode 10)
|-
! rowspan="2" scope="row" style="text-align:left;font-weight:normal" | 
| rowspan="2" | 40
| rowspan="2" | Scottsdale,Arizona
| rowspan="2" | The Bachelorette 8| bgcolor="#0047AB" align="center" span style="color:#FFFFFF;"|Faithful
| rowspan="2" style="background:thistle;"|Walked(Episode 10)
|-
| bgcolor="#67002f" style="color:#FFFFFF;"|Traitor
|-
! scope="row" style="text-align:left;font-weight:normal" | 
| 32
| Houston,Texas
| Political analyst
| rowspan=2 bgcolor="#0047AB" align="center" span style="color:#FFFFFF;"|Faithful
| rowspan="2" bgcolor="cornflowerblue"| Runner-Up(Episode 10)
|-
! scope="row" style="text-align:left;font-weight:normal" | 
| 30
| Reno,Nevada
| Music services director
|-
! scope="row" style="text-align:left;font-weight:normal" | 
| 51
| Jersey City,New Jersey
| Survivor: Panama| bgcolor="#67002f" align="center" span style="color:#FFFFFF;"|Traitor
| style="background:gold; color:black;"|Winner(Episode 10)
|}

 Notes 

Episodes

Voting history

Key
  The contestant was a Faithful.
  The contestant was a Traitor.
  The contestant had a Shield and was secretly immune from being Murdered.
  The contestant was ineligible to vote.

 Notes 

Reception
Critical responseThe Traitors received positive critical acclaim with many praising the show's cast, concept and setting. On review aggregator website Rotten Tomatoes, it holds an approval rating of 95% based on 20 reviews, with an average rating of 7.50/10. The site's critical consensus reads: "Hosted by Alan Cumming with theatrical relish, The Traitors deploys a rogues' gallery of reality television stars to make for a compelling murder mystery party." Alex Abad-Santos of Vox wrote that it "combines the acute pain of a corporate team-building exercise with some of the most emotionally fragile reality show celebrities that have ever been on television... and it's perfect." Alim Kheraj of The Guardian rated the show 4 out of 5 stars writing that "by the time you reach episode eight (which could already scoop the award for the year’s best hour of reality TV), the tension is so unbearable that you will be glad the last two episodes are there for binging." Linda Holmes of Pop Culture Happy Hour summarised the season as "Goofy, hyperdramatic, suspenseful and pretty entertaining." Dustin Rowles of Pajiba described the season as "A slickly produced version of Mafia set in a Scottish castle that features a number of contestants familiar to reality-show audiences and a number of newbies to make the whole enterprise more unpredictable." adding that "It’s really fun." Andy Dehnart of Reality Blurred'' wrote that "The Traitors had me a few seconds into its first episode, and only tightened its grip from there. This is outstanding competition reality TV, with all of the elements sliding confidently into place."

Missions 

  The team received the full amount of available prize money.
  The team DID NOT receive the full amount of available prize money.

Notes

International broadcasts 
In the United Kingdom, the series was acquired by the BBC as a companion to its British version, with episodes released on BBC iPlayer the day after the American release, January 13, 2023, and linear television airings for BBC Three and BBC One.

In Australia, the series was made available to stream on 10 Play in March 2023, as a companion to its Australia version broadcast by Network 10.

References

External links 
 
 

2020s American reality television series
2023 American television series debuts
American television series based on Dutch television series
English-language television shows
Peacock (streaming service) original programming
Television series by All3Media
Television shows filmed in Scotland
Television shows set in Scotland